Gloria Johnson may refer to:
Gloria Johnson (activist) (1937–2013), San Diego LGBT activist
Gloria Johnson (politician) (born 1962), Tennessee politician
Gloria Johnson-Powell (1936–2017), child psychologist